Jacob Sechler Coxey Sr. (April 16, 1854 – May 18, 1951), sometimes known as General Coxey, of Massillon, Ohio, was an American politician who ran for elective office several times in Ohio. Twice, in 1894 and 1914, he led "Coxey's Army", a group of unemployed men who marched to Washington, D.C., to present a "Petition in Boots" demanding that the United States Congress allocate funds to create jobs for the unemployed. Although the marches failed, Coxey's Army was an early attempt to arouse political interest in an issue that grew in importance until the Social Security Act of 1935 encouraged the establishment of state unemployment insurance programs.

Biography

Early years

Jacob Sechler Coxey was born on April 16, 1854, in Selinsgrove, Pennsylvania, the son of the former Mary Ann Sechler and Thomas Coxey. His father worked in a sawmill at the time Jacob was born, but the family pulled up stakes to move to industrially thriving Danville, Pennsylvania, in 1860, with Jacob's father taking a job working in an iron mill.

Known as Jake, Coxey excelled in school, attending local public schools and at least one additional year in a private academy before leaving to take his first job at the age of 16 as a water boy in the mill where his father worked.

Coxey spent eight years at the iron mill, advancing through the ranks from water boy to machine oiler, boiler tender, and finally to stationary engineer. Coxey left the mill in 1878 to establish a business partnership with an uncle in a Harrisburg scrap-iron business. In this capacity, Coxey went on a scrap iron buying trip to the town of Massillon, located 325 miles to the west, in 1881. Coxey liked the town so much that he decided to stay, cashing out of the scrap iron business and using the proceeds to purchase a large farm and establish a quarry producing silica sand for the manufacture of glass and iron.

Coxey was a passionate equestrian, who bred blooded horses and raced or sold them across the nation. Horse racing was among the most popular spectator sports in the United States and Coxey's horse-breeding enterprise was prosperous, but he fell into gambling on racing, which contributed to the end of his first marriage in 1888, after 14 years and four children.

Coxey would remarry in 1891, siring two more children, including a son named "Legal Tender" in honor of his father's quirky monetary obsessions.

First political interests

Coxey was born to parents who supported the Democratic Party and he entered politics under this banner. With the coming of the economic crisis of 1877, Coxey became a partisan of the United States Greenback Party, which ascribed the nations economic woes to faulty economic principles which led to a severe contraction of the money supply in the years after the American Civil War. Prosperity could be restored, Greenbackers believed, by the issuance of sufficient quantities of paper money.

When the People's Party emerged at the start of the 1890s, it earned the support of Coxey and most other Greenbackers and he shifted his allegiance to that political organization.

Coxey had experience as a laborer and an employer; he was also aware of the agricultural situation. He was a reformer who was willing to spend time and money to promote his plans for the betterment of the social order. Coxey was regarded by many contemporary observers as convincingly earnest. One reporter wrote, "He seems to be profoundly impressed with the suffering of mankind and with a belief that there is a deep-laid plan of monopolist to crush the poor to the earth."

He was often branded as a crank for challenging the economic system that made him so prosperous.

Coxey's Army

In 1893 a severe economic depression swept the United States – a crisis remembered as the Panic of 1893. Unemployment skyrocketed, bank runs paralyzed the local financial system, and credit dried up, while a protracted period of deflation put negative pressure on wages, prompting widespread lockouts and strikes.

Never one to be short of either self-confidence or political ambition, Coxey believed that he held the key to the nation's economic woes and began espousing a plan of public works, specifically road improvement, to be financed through the issuance of $500 million in paper money, backed by government bonds. This expenditure would in one swoop improve infrastructure, put unemployed workers to work, and loosen the strangled credit situation, Coxey believed.

To accompany his novel and controversial economic program, organized around the slogan "Good Roads", Coxey and his close political associate Carl Browne devised a novel political strategy designed to force the United States government into action. Rather than attempt to form a conventional political organization to capture decision-making offices, Coxey decided upon a course of what would later be known as direct action — the assembly of a mass of unemployed workers who would boldly march on Washington, DC to demand immediate satisfaction of their needs by Congress. This plan began to take shape early in the spring of 1894, to the point that by March the managing editor of the Chicago Record would assign young reporter Ray Stannard Baker to cover the "queer chap down there in Massillon" who was "getting up an army of the unemployed to march on Washington."

Many members of Coxey's family were opposed to his involvement in Coxey's Army. His father refused to talk to reporters and called his son "stiff necked", "cranky", and "pig-headed". One of Coxey's sisters called him an embarrassment.

He was a member of the Socialist Party circa 1912.

Death and legacy

Coxey lived to be 97 years old.  When asked his secret to longevity, he told reporters an array of reasons from elixirs to not resisting temptation.

Timeline
1885: Ran as the nominee of the Greenback Party for a seat in the Ohio State Senate but lost in his first attempt at public office.

1894: Led Coxey's Army, a march that started in Ohio, and passed through Pittsburgh in April.
Interest in the march dwindled in mid May. Coxey was concerned with the lack of meaningful work, and thus demanded that the federal government provide such for the unemployed. Coxey, his wife, and his son, Legal Tender Coxey, rode in a carriage ahead of some 400 protesters towards Washington D.C. He was arrested for walking on the grass and his army peacefully dispersed. Although it didn't seem to have much effect, the march on Washington and the growing threat of populism at this time struck fear into the hearts of many.

1894: Nominated by the People's Party for the 18th District seat in the U.S. House of Representatives.

1895: Nominated by People's Party for Governor of Ohio.

1897: Nominated by People's Party for Governor of Ohio.

1916: Unsuccessfully ran for a seat in the United States Senate.

1922: Ran as an independent for the U.S. House in the 18th District against incumbent Republican B. Franklin Murphy and lost.

1924: Ran as an independent for the U.S. House against Democratic incumbent John McSweeney in the 16th District, losing again.

1926: Ran for the Republican Party's nomination for the 16th District seat and lost in the primary election.

1928: Again tried unsuccessfully to get the Republican nomination for the U.S. Senate in the primary. In the general election, he ran as an independent for the U.S. House in the 16th District, against McSweeney again (who lost his seat to the Republican challenger Charles B. McClintock).  He also received two votes in the race for Frank Murphy's seat.  He also ran for President as the candidate of the Interracial Independent Political Party with Simon P. W. Drew as his running mate.

1930: Again lost the contest to be the Republican nominee in the 16th District U.S. House primary.

1931: Elected as mayor of Massillon.

1932: Again lost the contest to be the Republican nominee in the 16th District U.S. House primary.

1932: In 1932, unsuccessfully ran for the office of President of the United States on the ticket of the United States Farmer-Labor Party.

1934: Again lost the contest to be the Republican nominee in the 16th District U.S. House primary.

1936: Ran again in 1936 against Democratic incumbent William R. Thom, the successor to McSweeney and McClintock, this time under the banner of the Union Party, and again losing.

1938: Contested for the Democratic Party's nomination in the 16th District primaries and lost.

1941: Unsuccessfully tried to get the Democratic nomination for mayor of Massillon after losing his seat in 1933.

1942: Contested for the Democratic Party's nomination in the 16th District primaries and lost.

See also

 Ohio's 21st congressional district#Election results
 Ohio's 18th congressional district#Election results
 Ohio's 16th congressional district#Election results
 John Maynard Keynes

Footnotes

1854 births
1951 deaths
American manufacturing businesspeople
People from Selinsgrove, Pennsylvania
People from Massillon, Ohio
Ohio Farmer–Laborites
Ohio Independents
Ohio Populists
Ohio Democrats
Ohio Republicans
Ohio Greenbacks
Mayors of places in Ohio
Socialist Party of America politicians from Ohio
20th-century American politicians
Union Party (United States) politicians